In association football, the term Hexagonal (known in English as The Hex) was often used to refer to the final round of FIFA World Cup qualification among the six remaining teams in CONCACAF. The six-team round robin format was used by CONCACAF since the 1998 FIFA World Cup qualification process, up until the 2018 tournament. For 2022, this round was expanded to eight teams or an octagonal. It was modeled after the CONCACAF Championship which used the format ever since its second edition in 1965, and served as the World Cup qualifying tournament from 1974 to 1990.

The United States, Mexico, and Costa Rica were present in every Hexagonal. Mexico was the only national team that qualified for the FIFA World Cup in every Hexagonal.

The Hexagonal, or Hex for short, was named for the hexagon (a six sided shape) due to there being six teams remaining in the tournament at the time.

United States vs. Mexico rivalry

The United States and Mexico were the most successful teams in the Hexagonal, with Mexico qualifying for every World Cup since 1994. Indeed, the Mexico–United States soccer rivalry has been hotly contested during the Hexagonal. Matches between the two opponents hosted by Mexico often sell out the 100,000 seat Estadio Azteca in Mexico City; matches hosted in the United States are often held in cold northern cities such as Columbus, Ohio.

Episodes of this rivalry during Hexagonal matchdays include the Dos a Cero, a streak of four consecutive 2–0 victories for the United States at the Columbus Crew Stadium between 2001 and 2013. The streak ended on November 11, 2016 as the Mexicans defeated the Americans 1–2.

Another noteworthy event occurred on 15 October 2013, the final matchday of the Hexagonal on the road to the 2014 FIFA World Cup. The Mexicans were out of the World Cup as they were losing against Costa Rica in San José and Panama were defeating the Americans, both matches by 2–1. However, during stoppage time, Graham Zusi and Aron Jóhannsson scored for the United States, resulting in an American victory by 3–2, which helped Mexico qualify to the intercontinental play-off series against New Zealand. The United States national team Twitter account mocked the Mexicans by tweeting #YoureWelcomeMexico and tagging their Mexican counterparts' profile. Because of the significance of his goal, Zusi received recognition from some Mexican fans as "a saint". Zusi also revealed that Mexican player Marco Fabián thanked him for the goal.

1998

The first hexagonal round was played in 1997, between 2 March and 16 November. Mexico topped the round robin undefeated, being the only team to do so. Jamaica qualified to their first (and so far, only) FIFA World Cup. It was Canada's only participation in the hexagonal round, and their last appearance at the final stage of a FIFA World Cup qualification until 2022, in which he qualified for the tournament after 36 years.

2002

The second edition of The Hex was played in 2001, between 28 February and 11 November. It was topped by Costa Rica, who totaled a record 23 points. The Costa Ricans marked the first defeat Mexico ever had at a World Cup qualification match at home soil, in a match known as El Aztecazo.

2006

United States finished ahead of Mexico based on results between tied teams which were the first tiebreaker. 
Mexico, United States and Costa Rica  directly advanced to the 2006 FIFA World Cup.
Trinidad and Tobago advanced to the AFC-CONCACAF play-off, where they would defeat Bahrain 2–1 on aggregate to advance to the World Cup.

2010

The six teams that reached the fourth round formed one double-round-robin, home-and-away group nicknamed the "Hexagonal." The top three teams qualified for the 2010 FIFA World Cup. The fourth place team qualified for a home-and-away play-off against the fifth-place team from CONMEBOL.

2014

In the fourth round, the three group winners and three runners-up from the third round competed in a double round robin, including a home and away match against the other five teams between 6 February and 15 October 2013. The draw for 'The Hex' was conducted by FIFA on 7 November 2012.

The top three teams qualified directly for the 2014 FIFA World Cup finals, while the fourth-placed team advanced to a home-away series against the winner of Oceania, which ended up being New Zealand. Teams are ranked first by total points in all games, then, if tied, by best goal differential in all games, then by total goals in all games. If still tied, the same criteria are applied to games among the tied teams (including head-to-head away goals scored).

2018

 Mexico, Costa Rica and Panama qualified directly for the 2018 FIFA World Cup.
 Honduras advanced to the CONCACAF–AFC playoff; they would be defeated by Australia 3–1 on aggregate.
 The United States failed to qualify for the World Cup for the first time since the Hexagonal was introduced; they had qualified for every World Cup between 1990 and 2014.

Replacement and future
The Hexagonal was initially the top-seeded round in the CONCACAF qualifiers for the 2022 World Cup, but, following FIFA's decision on 25 June 2020 to postpone the September international window due to the COVID-19 pandemic (except UEFA), CONCACAF noted that "The challenges presented by postponements to the football calendar, and the incomplete FIFA rankings cycle in our confederation, means our current World Cup qualifying process has been compromised and will be changed." The confederation eventually announced on 27 July its new qualifying format for the World Cup, replacing the Hexagonal with an eight-team final round, dubbed the Octagonal.

For the 2026 FIFA World Cup, Canada, the United States, and Mexico may automatically qualify as co-hosts and if so, they will not participate in qualifiers for the final tournament, which will be expanded to 48 teams. The number of places allocated to CONCACAF for the 2026 tournament has been increased from three and a half to six including the hosts (if all three qualify), meaning three non-hosting CONCACAF teams will earn their berths in the final tournament from the CONCACAF qualifiers, along with two intercontinental play-off berths (one for each confederation except UEFA and one additional berth as CONCACAF is the host confederation).

Records

Ranking of teams

Notes

All-time table
3 points per win, 1 point per draw and 0 points per loss.

Team 
 Most appearances: ,  and : 6.
 Most times qualified to FIFA World Cup: : 6.
 Winners:
 : 3 (2006, 2010, 2014).
 : 2 (1998, 2018).
 : 1 (2002).

 Most points: , 110.
 Most points home: , 75.
 Most points away: , 36.

 Most won matches: , 32.
 Most won matches home: , 24.

 Most drawn matches: , 18.
 Most drawn matches away: , 12.

 Most lost matches: , 26.
 Most lost matches home: , 9.
 Most lost matches away: , 17.

 Most goals scored: , 100.
 Most goals scored home: , 70.
 Most goals scored away: , 33.

 Most drawn matches in a tournament: , 6 (1998).
 Fewest drawn matches in a tournament: , 0 (2018).

 Most lost matches in a tournament: , 8 (2006).
 Fewest lost matches in a tournament: , 0 (1998).

 Most points in a tournament: , 23 (2002).
 Fewest points in a tournament: , 2 (2006).

 Most goals scored in a tournament: , 23 (1998).
 Fewest goals scored in a tournament: , 4 (2006).

 Most goals covered in a tournament: , 22 (2010).
 Fewest goals covered in a tournament: , 6 (2006).

 Best goal difference in a tournament: , +16 (1998).
 Worst goal difference in a tournament: , -17 (2006).

 Best result:  6–0  (1998) and  6–0  (2018).
 Best result home:  6–0  (1998) and  6–0  (2018).
 Best result away:  0–3  (1998),  0–3  (2006) and  0–3  (2010).

Individual 
 Top scorer:  Carlos Pavon, 12.
 Top scorer in a tournament:  Carlos Hermosillo, 8 (1998).
 Hattricks and pokers:

Top goalscorers

Top goalscorers by tournament

References